James Yuill (born 1981) is an English folktronica musician from London, currently signed to the Moshi Moshi record label.

Biography
Yuill released his first album, The Vanilla Disc, on his own Happy Biscuit Club label in 2005.  After releasing his second album Turning Down Water for Air in February 2007, he was later signed by Moshi Moshi, who re-issued that album in January 2009. Turning Down Water for Air was described by Clash as "a startling piece of work". He has been described as "a one-man band armed with a laptop, mixing decks and an acoustic guitar".  His popularity grew internationally and he was signed by the Nettwerk Music Group in the United States in 2008.

Yuill also works as a remixer and has provided remixes for Tilly & the Wall, The Answering Machine, Au Revoir Simone, and David Holmes.  He has also collaborated  with Charlie Westropp under the pseudonym Hunger/Thirst.

In 2010, he produced a version of "Jingle Bells" for a Guinness commercial, using pint glasses containing varying levels of Guinness to create the tune.

In 2013, after a successful campaign on PledgeMusic, he released his fourth studio album called "These Spirits" on his Happy Biscuit Club label. Yuill's fifth album A Change In State was released in July 2017.

Discography

Albums
The Vanilla Disc (2005), Happy Biscuit Club
Turning Down Water for Air (February 2007), Happy Biscuit Club
Turning Down Water for Air (January 2009), Moshi Moshi
Earth EP/Fire EP (2009), Moshi Moshi
Movement In A Storm (2010), Moshi Moshi
These Spirits (2013), Happy Biscuit Club
A Change In State (2017), Happy Biscuit Club

Singles
"This Sweet Love" (2008), Moshi Moshi
"No Pins Allowed" (2008), Moshi Moshi
"No Surprise" (2009), Moshi Moshi
"Over The Hills" (2009), Moshi Moshi
"On Your Own" (2010), Moshi Moshi
"First In Line" (2010), Moshi Moshi
"Crying For Hollywood" (2011), Moshi Moshi
"Turn Yourself Around" (2013), The Happy Biscuit Club

References

External links

 
 
 Lazylistening review of James Yuill
 LAist interview

Living people
English electronic musicians
1981 births
Moshi Moshi Records artists